Luigi Zanetti (20 September 1921 – 9 November 2008) was an Italian gymnast. He competed at the 1948 Summer Olympics and the 1952 Summer Olympics.

References

1921 births
2008 deaths
Italian male artistic gymnasts
Olympic gymnasts of Italy
Gymnasts at the 1948 Summer Olympics
Gymnasts at the 1952 Summer Olympics
Sportspeople from Padua